Mughan plain (مغان دوزو) is a plain in northwestern Iran and the southern part of the Republic of Azerbaijan.

Mughan (مغان) may also refer to:

Places
 Mughan District, one of the administrative divisions of Shirvan Khanate
 Mughan Ganjali
 Mughan, Bilasuvar
 Mughan, Hajigabul
 Mughan, Jalilabad
 Mughan, Iran
 Mughan (province), a province of the Abbasid Caliphate, in present-day Iranian Azerbaijan

Other
 Mughan clashes
 Mughan culture
 Mughan FK
 Mughan Soviet Republic